Horst Mahseli (20 January 1934 – 3 December 1999)  was a Polish footballer, who is most famous for his 1950s performances in both Legia Warsaw and the Polish National Team.

References

1934 births
1999 deaths
Polish footballers
Poland international footballers
Polonia Bytom players
Legia Warsaw players
Sportspeople from Bytom
People from the Province of Silesia
Association football defenders